Fam or FAM is a colloquial term for 'family and friend' or an acronym of 'friend and mate' especially for intimate friends. It may also refer to:

People 
 Anthony Famiglietti (born 1978), American athlete
 Fam Ekman (born 1946), Swedish-Norwegian children's writer and illustrator
 Fam Irvoll (born 1980), Norwegian fashion designer
 Konstantin Fam (born 1972), Russian filmmaker

Sport 
 Football Association of Malawi
 Football Association of Malaysia 
 Football Association of Maldives
 Fútbol Americano de México

Other uses 
 Fam (TV series), an American television sitcom that debuted in 2019
 Fam Islands in Indonesia
 Fam language
 Family (disambiguation)
 Fat acceptance movement
 Federal Air Marshal, in the United States
 Federation of Associations of Maharashtra, an Indian trade association
 Fertility awareness method
 File Alteration Monitor
 Filipinas, Ahora Mismo, a Philippine radio show
 Filipino American Museum, in New York City
 Fitchburg Art Museum, in Massachusetts, United States
 Fluorescein amidite
 Foreign Affairs Manual, published by the United States Department of State
 Free Aceh Movement in Indonesia
 Free and Accepted Masons
 Fuzzy associative matrix
 Mexican Air Force